The SAR North–South Railway line is a 2,750 km (1,709 mi) network of railway lines in central and eastern Saudi Arabia, built and operated by the Saudi Railway Company. The primary line of the network connects the capital of the kingdom, Riyadh, to the border with Jordan at Al Hadithah.

The line starts from Al-Jalamid mine which is located in the northeast in the Northern Territory, through Al-Jawf and Hail until arriving at the "AlBaithah railway junction" in the Qassim region. It then headed toward the southeast for processing and export facilities at Ras Al-Khair in the Eastern Province near Jubail. The line shares infrastructure with the SAR Riyadh-Qurayyat Line between Buraidah and Al Nafud. The line is a dedicated freight corridor, however, the SAR Riyadh-Qurayyat Line operates only passenger services.

Current rail service 
The primary line shares infrastructure with the SAR Riyadh–Qurayyat line, and connects Riyadh to the border with Jordan at Al Haditha. Branch lines connect this main line to Ra's al-Khair (via Bauxite Junction), Hazm al-Jalamid (via Phosphate Junction), and Al Baseeta (via Al Baseeta Junction).

Stations 

An 85 km link is planned which would connect the North–South railway with the port at Jubail.

Infrastructure 
The first six of 25 EMD SD70ACS freight locomotives ordered in April 2009 were handed over to SAR at Port Dammam on 22 August 2010.

Passenger diesel push–pull trains made by Construcciones y Auxiliar de Ferrocarriles arrived in April 2015, and are designed to run at 200 km/h up to 55 degrees C. Each of the SAR trains includes a restaurant car, family zone and a prayer compartment, as well as both seating and sleeping cars. They are expected to run in formations of nine and 13 cars.

See also 

 Saudi Railways Organization (SRO)
 Saudi Railway Company (SAR)
 Transport in Saudi Arabia

References

External links
 Map of the project
  Saudi Railway Company

Railway lines in Saudi Arabia
Railway stations